Root resection or root amputation is a type of periradicular surgery in which an entire root of a multiroot tooth is removed.  It contrasts with an apicoectomy, where only the tip of the root is removed, and hemisection, where a root and its overlying portion of the crown are separated from the rest of the tooth, and optionally removed.

References

Endodontics